Murphree Hall is a historic student residence building located in the Murphree Area on the northern edge of the University of Florida campus in Gainesville, Florida.  It was designed by architect Rudolph Weaver in the Collegiate Gothic style and completed in 1939.  The building was named for Albert A. Murphree, the university's second president, who served from 1909 to 1927. Major renovations, which included adding air conditioning, were completed in 2005, and the hall was rededicated and open for that fall semester.

Murphree Hall is a contributing property in the University of Florida Campus Historic District which was added to the National Register of Historic Places on April 20, 1989.

See also 

 History of the University of Florida
 List of University of Florida buildings
 List of University of Florida presidents
 University of Florida Campus Historic District
 University of Florida student housing

References

External links 
  University of Florida - official website of the University of Florida.

Buildings at the University of Florida
Rudolph Weaver buildings
Historic district contributing properties in Florida
National Register of Historic Places in Gainesville, Florida
University and college buildings on the National Register of Historic Places in Florida
1939 establishments in Florida
University and college buildings completed in 1939
Residential buildings completed in 1939